Joseph George Cootes (1914 – after 1949) was a New Zealand professional rugby league footballer who played in the 1930s who was three-fourths Māori.

Playing career

International honours
Cootes represented New Zealand in 1936 against Great Britain (2 tests), in 1937 against Australia (2 tests), and on the 1938 New Zealand rugby league tour of Australia and 1939 New Zealand rugby league tour of Great Britain and France.

Later life
Cootes later worked as a labourer. He was convicted of assault in 1937 and 1939, serving two weeks in gaol for the second conviction.

References

1914 births
New Zealand national rugby league team players
New Zealand rugby league players
Place of birth missing
Place of death missing
Rugby league props
Rugby league second-rows
Wellington rugby league team players
Year of death missing